Béatrice Vialle (born 4 August 1961 at Bourges) is a French aviator, one of the two operational female Concorde pilots and the first French female pilot on a supersonic airliner.

Biography 

Graduating from École nationale de l'aviation civile (the French civil aviation university; named as "airline transport pilot student" 1981), she started her career at Air Littoral, flying an Embraer EMB 110 Bandeirante. She moved to Air France in 1985, where she flew an Airbus A320 and a Boeing 747 before becoming qualified on Concorde, on 24 July 2000.

She made her first commercial flight on the 19 November 2001 and so became one of the two female Concorde pilots (with the Briton Barbara Harmer) and the first French female pilot on a supersonic airliner. (Frenchwoman Jacqueline Auriol was the first woman who flew Concorde, but this was as a test pilot.)  In total Vialle made 45 supersonic flights Paris-New York City and 3 trips above the Atlantic Ocean. After the end of her Concorde flights (31 May 2003), she became a Captain flying Boeing 747-400s.

Bibliography 

 Académie nationale de l'air et de l'espace, Les français du ciel, dictionnaire historique, 2005, Le Cherche midi éditeur, 782p., p. 518, VIALLE, Béatrice, 
 Who's Who in France, 2012, 2307 p., notice « Vialle, Béatrice »,

References 

1961 births
French aviators
École nationale de l'aviation civile alumni
Concorde pilots
Living people
French women aviators
Women commercial aviators